Jesse or Yishai ( – Yīšay, in pausa  – Yīšāy, meaning "King" or "God's gift";  – Eshai;  – Iessaí), is a figure described in the Bible as the father of David, who became the king of the Israelites. His son David is sometimes called simply "Son of Jesse" (Ben Yishai). The role as both father of King David and ancestor of Jesus has been used in various depictions in art, e.g. as the Tree of Jesse or in hymns like "Lo, how a rose e'er blooming."

Biblical background

Narrative
According to the Bible, Jesse was the son of Obed and the grandson of Ruth and of Boaz. He lived in Bethlehem, in Judah, and was of the Tribe of Judah, he was a farmer, breeder and owner of sheep. He was a prominent resident of the town of Bethlehem. Jesse is important in Judaism because he was the father of the most famous King of Israel. He is important in Christianity, in part because he is in the Old Testament and mentioned in the genealogy of Jesus. Later rabbinic traditions name him as one of four ancient Israelites who died without sin, the other three being Benjamin, Chileab and Amram.

The Book of Samuel states that Jesse had eight sons, naming the first three as Eliab, Abinadab and Shammah, and David as the youngest. The Book of Chronicles names seven sons of Jesse—Eliab, Abinadab, Shimea, Nethanel, Raddai, Ozem and David—as well as two daughters, Zeruiah and Abigail. Among his grandchildren were the three sons of Zeruiah: Abishai, Joab and Asahel; and Amasa, the son of Abigail.

One day the prophet Samuel came to Bethlehem sent by God, to anoint the next king of Israel. Ostensibly, his visit to Bethlehem was to offer a sacrifice to God. He used that excuse because he was afraid that King Saul might kill him if he suspected the true reason for his arrival in Bethlehem. Samuel offered a sacrifice with Jesse and then went to his house, where he sanctified him and his family. The prophet asked Jesse to present his sons. When Samuel saw Eliab, Jesse's eldest son, he was impressed by his stature and convinced that he must be God's anointed king, however, God said to Samuel, "Do not consider his appearance or his height, for I have rejected him. The Lord does not look at the things man looks at. Man look at the outward appearance, but the Lord looks at the heart" (1 Samuel 16:7 NIV). When Jesse presented his second son, Abinadab, God told Samuel, "The Lord has not chosen this one either" (1 Samuel 16:8 NIV). This happened again with his third son, Shammah, then his fourth, fifth, sixth and seventh sons. Finally, Samuel inquired of Jesse if he had any other sons. Jesse told him that David the youngest was tending the flock. The prophet then asked for him to be brought in from tending the sheep. Samuel waited, and when he arrived God asked the prophet to anoint David as king over Israel (1 Samuel 16:13).

Some time later, Saul, suffering from depression and melancholy, asked Jesse for his son David to play the harp for him, since he had heard that David played the harp beautifully. Jesse sent his son along with some gifts for the King. The King was so taken with David's harp playing that he asked Jesse to keep him in his court to play for him whenever he was depressed. Later on Jesse sent his son David with gifts to be given to his older brothers who were to fight in the war against the Philistines in Saul's army. Years later David fled to the desert away from Saul, who sought to kill David in order for him to stay in power and not have his throne be taken away from him. David, worried about the safety of his parents, went to Mizpah in Moab, to ask permission from the King to allow his father Jesse and his mother to stay under the royal protection of the King. They stayed there until David's fortunes took a turn for the better.

In prophecy

The name Jesse is referenced in the Old Testament, and in particular the passages of the Book of Isaiah, Chapter 11, Verses 1–3:
 

Also Chapter 11, Verse 10: 

These are two of the verses regarded by Christians as prophecy of the advent of Jesus, whom they consider to be the Christ and Messiah. These two prophecies are regarded by Bahá'ís as referring to Bahá'u'lláh, alleged to also have arisen from "the stump of Jesse". These prophecies are also regarded in Latter-Day Saint Movement about the coming Root of Jesse, an ensign who holds special priesthood keys and a gathering of the Lord's people.

Tomb of Jesse 

The Tomb of Ruth and Jesse is an old stone structure on a hilltop in Hebron which today serves as a synagogue.  It receives numerous visitors every year, especially on the Jewish holiday of Shavuot when the Book of Ruth is read. The 1537 book Yihus HaAvos V'Neviim (Lineage of the Patriarch and the Prophets) describes the tomb as "a handsome building up on the mount, where Jesse, the King David's father is buried." It includes a drawing of the site, and notes an "ancient Israelite burial ground" nearby and Crusader courtyard. Rabbi Moshe Basola wrote in his travel journal that the site houses a cave which connects to the Tomb of Machpela, an assertion postulated by many over the years. The site was refurbished in 2009.

See also

 List of people named Jesse
 Nitzevet

Note

References

External links

 Tree of Jesse Directory 
 "Jesse" at behindthename.com
 Jesse the Patriarch at the Christian Iconography web site

Family of David
Books of Chronicles people
11th-century BCE Hebrew people
People from Bethlehem
Eastern Orthodox saints
Jewish Roman Catholic saints
Christian saints
Tribe of Judah
Ancient farmers